The Geological Survey and Mineral Exploration of Iran or in brief GSI is a government agency responsible for conducting geological and mineral surveys throughout the country, collecting the results of activities carried out in this field, establishing coordination, preparing and publishing geological maps of Iran. It is a subdivision of the Ministry of Industry, Mine and Trade, which was established in 1962 in cooperation with United Nations.

History
Nasrollah Khadem, Graduate of Mining engineering in Mines ParisTech, founded the Geological Survey and Mineral Exploration of Iran (GSI) in 1962 and was the head of this organization until 1974. Of course, the idea forming this organization dates back to 1959, and therefore, with the efforts of the Ministry of Industries and Mines, the law establishing of GSI was approved by National Consultative Assembly and Senate of Iran on August 20, 1959, and Geological Survey and Mineral Exploration of Iran (GSI) officially started its work in 1962. Therefore, according to the twenty-seventh principle of the amendment to the Constitution of the Islamic Republic of Iran, the license to establish the Geological Survey and Mineral Exploration of Iran (GSI) was issued based on an 8-article statute, which is summarized below:

 Article 1: It was decided that the government should establish a single organization called the Geological Survey and Mineral Exploration of Iran (GSI) in order to conduct geological surveys throughout the country, collect all the work done in this field and prepare, complete and publish geological maps of Iran.
 Article 2: A council called the Supreme Geological Council consisting of representatives of University of Tehran, National Iranian Oil Company, Plan and Budget Organization of the Islamic Republic of Iran and Ministry of Industries and Mines (Iran).
 Article 3: The head of organization should be appointed from among engineers with experience in mining or geology for a period of three years.
 Article 4: The Geological Survey and Mineral Exploration of Iran (GSI) should operate independent under the supervision of the Ministry of Industries and Mines.
 Article 5: The expenses of organization should be provided from the revenues of Ministry of Industries and Mines, National Iranian Oil Company and Plan and Budget Organization of the Islamic Republic of Iran, as well as from the revenues from the sale of publications and services.
 Article 6: Government and non-governmental companies and institutions should be in contact with the Geological Survey and Mineral Exploration of Iran (GSI) to provide and coordinate similar tasks such as preparing maps or geological reports of areas from all over the country.
 Article 7: Geological sections excavations performed by companies, contractors and institutions in the field of tunneling, canals, deep wells and boreholes for mines should be provided to the Geological Survey and Mineral Exploration of Iran (GSI).
 Article 8: The Ministry of Industries and Mines will be in charge of implementing this law.

In 1999, the exploration tasks of the Ministry of Industries and Mines were handed over entirely to the Geological Survey and Mineral Exploration of Iran. The organization is currently responsible for geological studies of the country and exploratory assessment of mineral resources except hydrocarbons (Petroleum and Natural gas).

Organization chart
The Geological Survey and Mineral Exploration of Iran (GSI) includes these administrative departments:

 Deputy Minister and Director General
 Deputy for Planning, Management Development and Support
 Management of Planning and Technology
 Management of Financial Affairs
 Management of Administrative and Human Resources Development
 Deputy of Exploration
 Management of Exploration Matters
 Regional and metallurgical explorations
 Metal Explorations
 Non-metallic Explorations
 Evaluation and Technical and Economic Studies
 Management of Exploration Support
 Geochemical Explorations
 Geophysical Explorations
 Operations and Explorations Drilling
 Surveying Group
 Management of Ore Dressing and Mineral Dressing
 Mineral Dressing Group
 Meta Production and Application of Minerals
 Deputy of Geology
 Management of Regional Geology
 Geological Surveying Group
 Lithology Group
 Tectonics and Paleontology Group
 Management of Geohazard, Engineering and Environmental Geology
 Geohazard and Engineering Geology Group
 Tectonics Earthquake Group
 Geotechnic Group
 Environmental Geology Group
 Management of Marine Geology
 Sedimentology Group
 Marine Chemistry Group
 Marine Geophysics Group
 Geomorphology Group
 Marine and Coastal Morphodynamics Group
 Management of Geometics
 GIS Group
 Integration and modeling Group
 Telemetry Group
 Cartography Group
 Aerial Geophysics Group
 Management of Director General
 Public Relations Office
 International Relations Office
 Library Office
 Management of Laboratories
 Chemical Decomposition Laboratory
 Geochemistry Laboratory
 Soil section
 Water section
 Laboratory of Precious Metals
 Mineralogy Laboratory
 XRD section
 Study section of polished cuts
 FTIR section
 Heavy Mineral Analysis Section
 Management of National Geosciences Database of Iran (NGDIR)
 Resource and Reserves Database Group
 Geological Database Group
 Geographic Database Group
 Management of Supervision and Evaluation
 Monitoring Group
 Control and evaluation Group
 Earth Sciences Research Office
 Research and educational affairs administration
 Research Groups
 Management of the Northeastern Region (Mashhad Branch)
 Management of the Northwestern Region (Tabriz Branch)
 Management of the Southeastern Region (Kerman Branch)
 Management of the Southern Region (Shiraz Branch)
 Management of the Southwestern Region (Ahwaz Branch)
 Quaternary Research Department
 Gemology Department
 Geotourism Department
 Security Department

Objectives of the organization
The policy of the Geological Survey and Mineral Exploration of Iran (GSI) according to the articles of association is to pursue the following goals:

 National policy and planning in geology and exploration
 Identifying geological environments and mineral potentials of the country and presenting the results in the form of "basic and practical information" for use in infrastructure, development, economic and social projects
 Research in the field of recognizing seismic areas of the country along with providing executive solutions for industrial urban development areas with the aim of reducing and preventing social and economic damage
 Research in the field of coastal engineering knowledge and exploration of non-living natural materials in the country's aquatic environments
 Exploration of new mineral reserves of the country, in different phases of regional exploration, search and public exploration up to the pre-feasibility stage with the aim of providing the necessary grounds and advantages for job creation, growth and development of the country
 Collection, processing and updating of geosciences data and information and infrastructure development with the aim of providing the information needs of scholars and miners and mining industries
 Implementation of joint research projects (inside and outside the country)
 Assistance in applied education of higher education centers of the country

The perspective of twenty-year plan of the GSI
The perspective of 20-year plan of the Geological Survey and Mineral Exploration of Iran (GSI) emphasizes the following:

 Providing the necessary grounds and infrastructure for the growth of knowledge-based activities and sustainable development of the country through the identification of geological environments
 Identify resources and discover mineral reserves
 Identify the processes that create and control geological hazards and measure their behavior
 Expanding Geocience Databases

Geology department strategy
According to the perspective of 20-year plan of the GSI, the geology department pursues the following items:

 Help create a safe community and a healthy environment
 Development of information infrastructures based on the growth of knowledge-based activities
 Development of human resources and capabilities of geoscience technology
 Development of geological standards in the design and implementation of development plans
 Active presentation of information in the field of geosciences

Exploration department strategy
According to the perspective of 20-year plan of the GSI, the exploration department pursues the following items:

 Increasing the country's competitiveness in the mining sector through the exploration of mineral reserves
 Expand mineral exploration capacity
 Development of human resources and capabilities of exploratory technology
 Participation in regional development and job creation

Personnels and branches
The Geological Survey and Mineral Exploration of Iran (GSI) has about 1000 personnel with high scientific degrees and using laboratory equipment and computer facilities. The organization is headquartered in Tehran and has 16 general branches covering almost all regions of Iran for geological and indigenous exploration studies. The GSI also has mutual cooperation and joint research programs with other organizations in Iran and abroad.

The GSI products
Among the services and products of the Geological Survey and Mineral Exploration of Iran (GSI), the following can be mentioned:

 Preparation of geological map, economic geology map, engineering geology map, environmental hazards map, geochemical and aerial geophysical maps of the entire area of Iran
 Preparation of 2351 maps in different geological information structure and different scales
 Preparation and publication of 88 volumes of books in the field of geoscience
 Preparation and publication of 2 journals in the field of geoscience (monthly and quarterly)
 Provides 825 reports of earthquakes and other geological events
 Preparation and presentation of 6811 geological articles in various scientific circles
 Preparation and presentation of mineral information database
 Collaboration in making a documentary film in the field of geoscience

The Journal
The Geological Survey and Mineral Exploration of Iran (GSI) has been publishing Scientific Quarterly Journal of Geosciences since the fall of 1992 in order to transfer geological knowledge and publish new scientific findings.

The Museum
The Museum of the Geological Survey and Mineral Exploration of Iran (GSI) is a specialized museum that called Geoscience Museum, established in 1959 and specifically contains samples of rocks, minerals, fossils and old mining objects obtained from different parts inside and outside the country. In this museum, more than 400 samples of rocks, 1500 samples of fossils and more than 1400 samples of minerals from Iran and other countries are kept. The museum also has 65 instances of ancient mining tools and equipment. The various sections of the Museum of Earth Sciences include the section on antique mining tools and archaeological objects, rocks, precious and semi-precious minerals, fossils, vertebrate fossils, and the Geological Screening Film Hall. In the special sections, those interested can also get acquainted with the meteorites and quartz crystals grown by local experts, and the bone and fossil footprints and dinosaur eggs. Also in the fossil vertebrate section, there are significant fossils from all Cambrian geological periods up to the present time. The fossils have been collected in two groups of plants and animals from different formations of the country. In 2008, the museum was completely renovated.

The Library
The library of the Geological Survey and Mineral Exploration of Iran (GSI) was established in 1959 with the aim of collecting, organizing and disseminating geological information. The GSI library currently has the most complete collection of specialized books and publications in geosciences with more than 10,000 titles of books and reports in Persian and Latin. The GSI library consists of the following sections:
 Reference services
 Organizing information
 Resources and deposits
 Periodicals
 Order and receive
 Library Archive
 Publishing sales
 Visual and Publications

See also
 Geology of Iran
 National Geoscience Database of Iran
 National Geographical Organization of Iran

References

External links
 Iranian Journal of Earth Sciences
 Geological Survey and Mineral Exploration of Iran (GSI) profile on researchgate
 Geological Survey and Mineral Exploration of Iran (GSI) profile on OceanExpert
 Iran ready to conduct mineral exploration projects in regional countries - TehranTimes
 GSI exploration operations up 15% in 4 months - TehranTimes
 GSI plans a two-fold rise in mining exploration operations by Mar. 2021 - TehranTimes
 GSI carries out exploration operations on 150,000 sq.km in a year - TehranTimes

Geology of Iran
Government agencies of Iran
Research institutes in Iran
Ministry of Industry, Mine and Trade (Iran)